The Beaufort West mine is a large mine located near Beaufort West in the northern part of the Western Cape, South Africa. Beaufort West represents one of the largest uranium reserves in South Africa having estimated reserves of 23 million tonnes of ore grading 0.08% uranium.

References 

Uranium mines in South Africa
Economy of the Western Cape
Geography of the Western Cape
Beaufort West Local Municipality